Molinos is a village in the Arica and Parinacota Region, Chile.

References

Populated places in Arica Province